Prathidhawani is a 1971 Indian Malayalam-language film, directed by Vipin Das and produced by Upasana. The film stars Raghavan, Radhamani, Rani Chandra and Syamkumar. The film's score was composed by M. L. Srikanth.

Cast
Raghavan
Radhamani
Rani Chandra
Syamkumar
Usha Saraswathi
Usharani
Vasu Pradeep
Aarathi

References

External links
 

1971 films
1970s Malayalam-language films